SLCPunk! is a 1998 American comedy-drama film written and directed by James Merendino. The film centers around Steven "Stevo" Levy, a college graduate and punk living in Salt Lake City during the mid-1980s.

SLCPunk! was chosen as the opening-night feature at the 1999 Sundance Film Festival.
 
Merendino created the film based on his experience growing up in Salt Lake City. Although the film is not autobiographical, Merendino has said that many characters were based on people he knew.

Plot
The film outlines the daily life of a punk named Stevo in Salt Lake City, Utah in the fall of 1985. Stevo's best friend, "Heroin" Bob, is also a punk. The nickname "Heroin" is ironic, as Bob is afraid of needles and actually believes that any drug (with the notable exception of alcohol and cigarettes) is inherently dangerous.

Stevo and Bob go from party to party while living in a dilapidated apartment. They spend much of their time fighting with members of other subcultures, particularly rednecks. Stevo has a casual relationship with a girl named Sandy, while Bob is in love with Trish, the manager of a head shop.

The two of them are shaped by their experiences with their parents. Stevo's parents, now divorced, are former hippies who are proud of their youthful endeavors; however, Stevo is revolted by what he perceives as their "selling out" by becoming affluent Reagan Republicans, which they lamely try to justify. Stevo's grades are excellent, and when his father sends an application to Harvard Law School and Stevo is accepted, he nevertheless rejects it because of his beliefs. By contrast, Bob's father is a mentally ill alcoholic who mistakes his son and his friend for Central Intelligence Agency operatives and chases them away with a shotgun when they visit him on his birthday.

Stevo begins to see the drawbacks of living the punk life. Sean, a fellow punk, was a drug dealer who once attempted to stab his mother while under the influence of an entire 100-dose sheet of acid; in the present, Stevo finds him panhandling on the street with some obvious mental issues.

While Stevo understands that his relationship with Sandy is casual, he is still enraged when he discovers her having sex with another man and savagely beats him, later loathing himself because his action contradicts his own belief in anarchism. His social circle also begins to drift away, as his friend, Mike, leaves Salt Lake City to attend the University of Notre Dame. Soon after, Stevo attends a party and falls in love with a rich girl named Brandy, who points out that his clothing and hair are fashion as opposed to true rebellion. Rather than being offended, Stevo takes the criticism thoughtfully, and they passionately kiss.

At the same party, Bob complains of a headache (induced by Spandau Ballet's "She Loved Like Diamond" playing on a stereo), and is given Percodan, which he consumes with alcohol after being told the pills are simply "vitamins" that will help his headache. The accidental drug overdose kills him in his sleep. When Stevo discovers Bob's body, he breaks down completely. At the funeral, he appears with a shaved head and changed clothing, having decided he is done with being a punk. He plans to go to Harvard, and earlier narration suggests that he eventually marries Brandy. He notes in his closing narration that his youthful self would probably kick his future self's ass, wryly describing himself as having been ultimately just another poseur.

The "Tribes"
The film features several cliques presented as tribes. The film focuses primarily on the punk tribe, but includes several others as well:
 Punks: Stevo, Bob, Sean, Megan, and Mike belong to this tribe, although Mike does not dress the part. The punks are rivals of the mods, nazis and rednecks.
 Mods: Mods wear suits and ties, and they ride scooters. They are generally the rivals of the punks, but the character John the Mod acts as a diplomat who freely moves between the tribes.
 Rednecks: Rednecks are rural Utah folk who wear trucker caps and flannel, and drive around in big trucks. Punks hate them for their conservative views.
 Neo-Nazis: Neo-Nazis are white power skinheads who wear pseudo-military fatigues and Nazi armbands. Punks and mods are shown to hate them.
 The heavy metal Guys: They have long hair and flannel. Not much else is known about them, except that Stevo explains that they are predatory toward the new wavers.
 New wavers: They are people who dress like new romantics and are said to be the least threatening of the tribes. They are described as being "the new hippies." Every tribe is predatory to the new wavers.

Cast

 Matthew Lillard as Steven "Stevo" Levy
 Christopher Ogden as young Stevo
 Michael Goorjian as "Heroin" Bob
 Francis Capra as young Bob
 Jason Segel as Mike
 Annabeth Gish as Trish
 Jennifer Lien as Sandy
 Christopher McDonald as Mr. Levy
 Devon Sawa as Sean the Beggar
 Adam Pascal as “Mod” Eddie 
 Til Schweiger as Mark
 James Duval as John the Mod
 Summer Phoenix as Brandy

Production notes

The film was shot in an aggressive, highly kinetic style, with sweeping crane shots, fast dolly moves, and jump cuts.

Most of the film was shot on location in Salt Lake City, with a scene taking place in Evanston, Wyoming. Numerous scenes took place in locally well-known areas:
 The high school, which Heroin Bob calls "Southeast High", is West High School near downtown Salt Lake City.
 The scene where Heroin Bob chastises Stevo for using acid takes place at Presidents Circle at the University of Utah.
 Stevo introduces the "poseurs" and gives his "Who Started Punk Rock?" speech at the now-defunct Cottonwood Mall in Holladay, Utah.  Sean's "women's clothing" job interview takes place inside a Cottonwood Mall storefront.
 Stevo and Sandy drop acid at Memory Grove Park, a World War I memorial park.
 Many exterior street scenes occur just north of the Frank E. Moss Federal Courthouse in the downtown area. The scene where Stevo and Sandy run into Sean begging was shot on Market Street. You can see The Felt and Boston Buildings in the background. Sean is standing in front of the old Odd Fellows Building which currently houses The Dennis Group Engineering consulting at 26 W Market Street. Trish’s head shop was on the 200 block of E 300 S. The Broadway Plaza at 250 E 300 S is visible when Mark walks in. 
 The ECP concert was shot at the old Deseret News Paper Mill at the mouth of Big Cottonwood Canyon, posing as The SLC Indian Center.
 The scenes depicting Heroin Bob's funeral were shot inside and outside The Cathedral of the Madeleine. The cathedral is located just east of downtown Salt Lake City.
 The apartment where Stevo and Heroin Bob live was the Big D Construction building, across from Pioneer Park.
 The store where they bought the "Wyoming Beer" is 'Porter's Fireworks and Liquor' on the outskirts of Evanston.

Soundtrack

 "I Never Promised You a Rose Garden" - The Suicide Machines (originally performed by Lynn Anderson)
 "Sex and Violence" - The Exploited
 "I Love Livin' in the City" - Fear
 "1969" - The Stooges
 "Too Hot" - The Specials
 "Cretin Hop" - Ramones
 "Dreaming" - Blondie
 "Gangsters" - The Specials
 "Kiss Me Deadly" - Generation X
 "Rock N' Roll" - The Velvet Underground
 "Gasoline Rain" - Moondogg
 "Mirror in the Bathroom" - Fifi (originally performed by The English Beat)
 "Amoeba" - The Adolescents
 "Kill the Poor" - Dead Kennedys
 "Look Back and Laugh" - Minor Threat

Eight Bucks Experiment, the band portraying fictional English band ECP, were featured on a European release of the soundtrack. The three songs they recorded live for the punk concert scene were sent back to the band after filming. They self-released the songs on the One Of These Days EP through their Blue Moon Recordings label website.

Release

Box office
The film premiered in the United States at the Sundance Film Festival on January 22, 1999. It received a wide release on April 16, 1999, grossing $36,218 on its opening weekend and amassing a total domestic gross of $299,569 by the time it left theaters.

Critical reception
On review aggregator website Rotten Tomatoes, the film holds an approval rating of 61% on 33 reviews, with an average rating of 5.6/10. The website's critics consensus reads: "Merging anarchic spirit with straightforward melodrama, SLC Punk is a hit-and-miss odyssey of youthful rebellion elevated by Matthew Lillard's dramatically potent star turn." Metacritic assigned the film a weighted average score of 50 out of 100, based on 21 critics, indicating "mixed or average reviews".

Roger Ebert of the Chicago Sun-Times gave the film three-out-of-four stars, praising Lillard's performance and writing that the film offers "a little something there for all of us". Janet Maslin, writing for The New York Times, called the film "likable for its outlandishness, less so when it shows a self-important streak". Dennis Harvey of Variety called it "energetic but poorly structured", writing that the film "doesn't quite grasp how its slick, flashy package undermines any actual punk cred". Nathan Rabin of The A.V. Club wrote that "S.L.C. Punk! takes a potentially fascinating subject and reduces it to a mawkish compendium of film-festival clichés". David Luty of Film Journal International wrote a mostly negative review of the film, stating that it "cannot quite reach the richer depths it grasps for, because it doesn't have the material to support the large dramatic distance Stevo has to travel".

Sequel

In April 2013, director James Merendino announced that a sequel to SLC Punk! titled Punk's Dead would begin filming later in the year and would be released in 2014 with most of the original cast reprising their roles.  The film was successfully funded by an Indiegogo campaign launched on October 27, 2013, and completed on January 15, 2014. Merendino said of the sequel, “I made SLC Punk! when I was a kid, and accordingly, the story is naive, and, as just a coming of age story, not finished. The characters are facing big questions, 18 years later, as outsiders, punk rockers… What relevance do they have in a world where all statements have already been made? In the years since I made SLC Punk!, it has found a rather large and supportive following who have been very kind to me. So in making a sequel, I feel I owe it to those people to really do it right."

In May 2014, the film was announced to be shooting in June, with its cast officially announced to include Devon Sawa, Michael Goorjian, Adam Pascal and James Duval returning as Sean, Heroin Bob, Eddie and John the Mod, respectively, with Ben Schnetzer appearing as Heroin Bob's son, Ross, Machine Gun Kelly as Crash, and Hannah Marks and Sarah Clarke portraying the female leads. Also in May, Matthew Lillard and Jason Segel, who starred in the original film announced through social media that they would not be reprising their roles.

Comic book adaptation
In 1998 SLC Punk! was adapted into a comic book, illustrated by Dean Haspiel.

References

External links

 
 
 
 

1999 films
1990s coming-of-age comedy-drama films
American coming-of-age comedy-drama films
Films set in Salt Lake City
Films set in 1985
Films set in the 1980s
Films shot in Salt Lake City
American independent films
Punk films
Sony Pictures Classics films
Films directed by James Merendino
Films shot in Wyoming
Films adapted into comics
1998 independent films
1990s English-language films
1990s American films